The European Association of Zoos and Aquaria (EAZA), is an organisation for the European zoo and aquarium community that links over 340 member organisations in 41 countries. EAZA membership is open to all zoos and aquaria across Europe that comply with EAZA's standards. The organisation is administered and headquartered at Natura Artis Magistra in Amsterdam, the Netherlands.

The mission of the association is to promote cooperation for furthering regional collection planning and wildlife conservation. EAZA also promotes educational activities and advises EU lawmakers through standing committees of the European Parliament and the European Council.

EAZA Ex-situ Programme 
EAZA manages the EAZA Ex-situ Programme (EEP), a population management and conservation programme. As of 2022, over 400 animal species are represented in the programme.

Each EEP has a coordinator who is assisted by a species committee. The coordinator collects information on the status of all the animals kept in EAZA zoos and aquariums of the species for which they are responsible, produces a studbook, carries out demographic and genetic analyses, produces a plan for the future management of the species and provides recommendations to participating institutions.

Thematic conservation campaigns 

Every two years EAZA launches a campaign dedicated to a threatened species or a threatened Environment. The campaign's aims are to draw attention to the problem, to promote biodiversity awareness, raise funds for special projects and to do lobbying work in national governments and international organizations.

The campaigns address EAZA members to get involved in the themes and to spread information about the importance of biodiversity and its conservation to the visitors.

Campaign for the Ukrainian zoos 
In 2022, during the Russo-Ukrainian War, EAZA launched a funding campaign to save animals from Ukrainian zoos. In June 2022 EAZA had collected €1 324 884  from over 130 institutional and 11 000 private donors, and funds have been provided to nearly 20 institutions in Ukraine.  Funds were allocated on the basis of need according to the requests received from zoos, and were distributed to recipients through channels subject to change due to possible war-time disruptions.

List of EAZA member institutions 

As of April 2022, EAZA has 307 Full Members, 16 Temporary Members, 24 Candidates for Membership, 48 Corporate Members and 37 Associate Members represented in 48 countries.

Full members

Temporary members

Candinates for membership

Associate members

Indirect members 
These zoos and aquariums are members through an aforementioned associate organization.

Former members

See also
 List of zoo associations
 World Association of Zoos and Aquariums

References

External links 

 EAZA Homepage
 Zootierliste - Unofficial database of animal husbandry and species records in European and EAZA/EEP member zoos, in English language

Organizations established in 1992
Zoo associations